Seymour Chwast (born August 18, 1931) is an American graphic designer, illustrator, and type designer.

Biography 
Chwast was born in the Bronx, New York City and in 1949 graduated from Abraham Lincoln High School in Brooklyn where he was introduced to graphic design by Leon Friend.

He graduated with a Bachelor of Fine Arts from Cooper Union in 1951. With Milton Glaser, Edward Sorel, and Reynold Ruffins, he founded Push Pin Studios in 1954. The bi-monthly publication The Push Pin Graphic was a product of their collaboration. Chwast is famous for his commercial artwork, which includes posters, food packaging, magazine covers, and publicity art. Often referred to as "the left-handed designer," Chwast's unique graphic design melded social commentary and a distinctive style of illustration. Today, he continues to work and is principal at Pushpin Group, Inc. in New York City.

In 1985, he received the AIGA Medal.

In 2006, he was hired by Roblox to design the faces for their characters. He is the font designer of Chwast Buffalo, Fofucha, Loose Caboose NF, and Weedy Beasties NF. He is a member of Alliance Graphique International (AGI). Chwast married designer Paula Scher in 1973 and divorced five years later. They remarried in 1989.

=Fonts Designed<ref name"Chwast, Seymour p. 249-50">Chwast, Seymour, The Push Pin Graphic, A Quarter Century of Innovative Design and Illustration, Chronicle Books, San Francisco, California, 2004, p. 249-50.</ref>==
 Artone (1964, Photo Lettering Inc.) 
 Blimp (1970, Photo Lettering Inc.) 
 Buffalo (1978, Mergenthaler) 
 Filmsense (1970, Photo Lettering Inc.) 
 Monograph (1972, Photo Lettering Inc.) 
 Myopic (1971, Photo Lettering Inc.)

Awards
1972 – Augustus Saint Gaudens Award, The Cooper Union School of Art
1983 – Art Directors Hall of Fame
1985 – American Institute of Graphic Arts Medal
1989 – National Jewish Book Award in the Children's Picture Book category for Just Enough Is Plenty 
1992 – Honorary Doctorate, Parson's School of Design
1997 – Masters Series, School of Visual Arts
2011 – Inkpot Award

BooksDocteur Dolittle (Sztajn Lili, Seymour Chwast, Lili Sztajn, Philippe Bretelle), Helium livres illustrés (French Edition), 2018 At War with War: 5000 Years of Conquests, Invasions, and Terrorist Attacks, An Illustrated Timeline (by Seymour Chwast, Victor Navasky), Seven Stories Press, 2017 The Pancake King (By Phyllis La Farge, Illustrated by Seymour Chwast, Ate by Seth Swerine), Princeton Architectural Press, 2016About Diabetes: Your Guide to Good Health (by Learning About Diabetes Inc., Seymour Chwast), Learning About Diabetes Inc., 2016 Dr. Dolittle (by Seymour Chwast), Creative Editions, 2015 
Still Another Number Book: A Colorful Counting Book (by Seymour Chwast, Martin Moskof), Dover Publications, 2014 Still Another Alphabet Book: A Colorful Puzzle & Game Book (by Seymour Chwast, Martin Moskof), Dover Publications, 2014 Tall City, Wide Country (by Seymour Chwast), Creative Editions, 2013 Get Dressed! (by Seymour Chwast), Harry N. Abrams, 2012 Bobo's Smile (by Seymour Chwast), Creative Editions, 2012 The Odyssey (by Seymour Chwast), Bloomsbury USA, 2012 Graphic Style: From Victorian to New Century (by Steven Heller, Seymour Chwast), Harry N Abrams Inc, 2011 The Canterbury Tales (by Seymour Chwast), Bloomsbury USA, 2011 Dante's Divine Comedy: A Graphic Adaptation (by Seymour Chwast), Bloomsbury Publishing plc, 2010Seymour: The Obsessive Images of Seymour Chwast (by Seymour Chwast, Steven Heller, Paula Scher), Chronicle Books, 2009 Had Gadya: A Passover Song (by Seymour Chwast, Michael Strassfeld), Square Fish, 2009 Illustration: A Visual History (by Steven Heller, Seymour Chwast), Harry N Abrams, 2008 She Sells Sea Shells: World Class Tongue Twisters (by Seymour Chwast), Applesauce Press, 2008 The Push Pin Graphic: A Quarter Century of Innovative Design and Illustration (by Seymour Chwast, introduction by Martin Venezky), Chronicle Books, 2004 Graphic Style: From Victorian to Digital (by Steven Heller, Seymour Chwast), Harry N Abrams, 2001 Traffic Jam (by Seymour Chwast), Houghton Mifflin Harcourt, 1999 The Twelve Circus Rings (by Seymour Chwast), Harcourt Childrens Books, 1996 Goodbye, Hello : Everything You Need to Help Your Child When Your Family Moves, Parenting Packs (by Seymour Chwast) Harry N Abrams Inc, 1997 Mr. Merlin and the Turtle (by Seymour Chwast), Greenwillow, 1996 Jackets Required (by Steven Heller, Seymour Chwast), Chronicle Books, 1995 Bra Fashions By Stephanie (by Seymour Chwast), Warner Books, 1994 The Alphabet Parade (by Seymour Chwast), Voyager Books, 1994 Graphic Style: From Victorian to Post-Modern (by Steven Heller, Seymour Chwast), Harry N Abrams, 1994 Just Enough Is Plenty: A Hanukkah Tale (by Barbara Diamond Goldin and Seymour Chwast), Viking Kestrel, 1988  Art Against War: Four Hundred Years of Protest in Art (by D. J. R. Bruckner, Seymour Chwast, Steven Heller), Abbeville Press, 1984 Paper Pets: Make Your Own 3 Dogs, 2 Cats, 1 Parrot, 1 Rabbit, 1 Monkey (by Seymour Chwast), Harry N Abrams Inc 1993 Trylon and Perisphere: 1939 New York World's Fair (by Barbara Cohen, Steven Heller, Seymour Chwast), Harry N Abrams Inc, 1989 Italian Futurism & Art Deco (Design & Style, No. 4) (by Steven Heller, Seymour Chwast), Mohawk Paper Mills/The Pushpin Group, 1988Sam's Bar (by Seymour Chwast), Doubleday, 1987 New York Observed: Artists and Writers Look at the City, 1650 to the Present (by Barbara Cohen (ed.), Seymour Chwast (ed.), Steven Heller(ed.)), Harry N Abrams Inc, 1987 Happy birthday, Bach (by Peter Schickele, Seymour Chwast), Doubleday, 1985 The Left-Handed Designer (by Steven Heller, Seymour Chwast), Harry N Abrams, 1985 The Art of New York (by Seymour Chwast, Steven Heller), Harry N. Abrams, 1983 Amazing Magical Jell-O Desserts (by Seymour Chwast, Arnold Rosenberg), General Foods Corporation, 1977 Esquire Party Book (by Scotty & Ronnie; Esquire Editors Welch), Esquire''/Harper & Row, 1965

References

External links
Seymour Chwast/PushPin
AIGA Medalists: Seymour Chwast
Art Directors Club biography, portrait and images of work
A brief visit with Seymour Chwast: Icon of Contemporary Graphic Arts
Fonts by Seymour Chwast
Font Designer - Seymour Chwast
Seymour Chwast - Colorado State University Libraries Poster Collection
Postage stamps designed by Seymour Chwast
Karl Fugelso, "Dante as Sam Spade: Seymour Chwast’s Adaptation of the Commedia," The Year's Work inMedievalism 27 (2012). Essay on Chwast's 2010 graphic novel, Divine Comedy.

1931 births
AIGA medalists
American graphic designers
American magazine illustrators
American typographers and type designers
Artists from the Bronx
Cooper Union alumni
Inkpot Award winners
Living people
People from the Bronx